Giuseppe Barbaglia (1841–1910) was an Italian painter.

Biography
He was born in Milan. At the age of twenty due to a romantic entanglement, he was forced to leave Milan, and during his travels, he developed gangrene of the leg, requiring amputation. He returned to Milan and trained under Giuseppe Bertini. 
He painted a number of indoor scenes of persons in Rococo finery, usually with the background of the grand salon of the Palazzo Clerici; these include: 
Il Mattino di Parini 
L'Arlecchino ardito 
Il suonatore di contrabbasso
Il suonatore d' arpa 
Mezzogiorno e Vespro
He was also known for his bright and colorful portraits, including one of Giuseppe Verdi, exhibited in Venice in 1887. Among his works:
Christ in the Garden
The Civil Wedding of sindaco Giulio Bellinzaghi
Bagno Pompeiano (Canonico Prize)
L' Alloggio forzato (Forced Quartering)
La carestia in Sicilia (Pavia)

References

1841 births
1910 deaths
19th-century Italian painters
Italian male painters
20th-century Italian painters
Painters from Milan
19th-century Italian male artists
20th-century Italian male artists